Social media and political communication in the United States refers to how political institutions, politicians, private entities, and the general public use social media platforms to communicate and interact in the United States.

The rise of social media in the mid-2000s profoundly changed political communication in the United States, as it allowed regular individuals, politicians, and thought leaders to publicly express their opinions to, and engage with, wide networks of like-minded individuals. As social media activity has grown, the participation of social media users has become an increasingly important element of political communication. The digital architecture of each social media platform influences how users receive information and interact with each other, thereby influencing the political communication strategies employed on each social media platform. Users can connect directly to politicians and campaign managers and vice versa.

Through the use of social media platforms such as Twitter, Facebook, Instagram, and Twitch, politicians can take advantage of financial resources such as crowdfunding. Through crowdfunding, politicians can raise more money for their campaign via social media platforms in significantly less time than would otherwise be achievable with traditional platforms. In 2012, President Obama raised over $1 billion for his campaign, which, at that time, broke the fundraising record. Around $690 million was raised through online donations, including social media, email, and website donations. More money was raised from small donors than ever before.

However, social media campaigns carry risks that are not present on traditional platforms such as TV or newspaper ads. Because of the open nature of information on social media platforms, dissenting opinion can undermine the messaging of social media campaigns in a way that is not present with the use of traditional platforms.

Influence on elections

2004 presidential election

Howard Dean's campaign
Democrat Howard Dean, who served as the Governor of Vermont from 1991 to 2003 and ran for president in the 2004 United States presidential election, is credited with being the first politician to use the Internet for political purposes. Dean won a "digital" primary election that was held on MoveOn.org, getting 44% of the votes. His success in the primary generated positive coverage from the news media. This early victory was important to the campaign's momentum. Dean is credited with organizing the first campaign website, which acted as a virtual headquarters for fundraising and volunteer recruitment. The website also measured several online metrics of success, including hits on his homepage, weblogs, campaign sign-ups, house parties, and meetups.

Additionally, Dean encouraged the use of the website Meetup for his upstart presidential campaign in 2002 to make it easy for people "with a common interest to find each other and arrange to meet, face-to-face." Dean's supporters hosted house parties and invited individuals to learn about Dean's campaign, and individuals would attend face-to-face meetings to learn more about his campaign. A total of about 143,000 individuals attended Dean's Meetups in 600 locations across the country. About 75,000 individuals attended these meetups, with more than 96% of respondents reporting that they wished to become actively involved in Dean's campaign. The engagement in face-to-face local groups "dramatically affected how involved volunteers got with the campaign. The more meetups people attended, the higher their average donation to the campaign".

Dean's campaign was able to raise large amounts of money in small increments. In January 2004, his campaign had raised $41 million, mostly from online supporters.  A total of 318,884 individuals contributed to his campaign, with over 61% of the contributions being under $200. Less than 1% of individuals gave $2000, the federal limit. Dean's fundraising behavior was the opposite of his rivals. George Bush raised $130.8 million in 2003, and 68% of his donations were the maximum donation limit.

Political origins of Facebook
Facebook is a common platform where people interact with each other through social media. An example of what can be done on Facebook is, "an individual creates multimedia content like a video on the cognitive level", which allows for mass interaction between hundreds of people. This free interaction between people on Facebook attracted political figures to use social media by to help promote their ideals. The creator of Facebook, Mark Zuckerberg, served as a field organizer for Democrat John Kerry in the 2004 presidential election. Zuckerberg was responsible for get-out-the-vote and other mobilization efforts. Facebook was also launched this same year, on February 4, 2004. The Facebook platform relies on group formation and constant communication, both of which are goals for any political campaign.

2008 presidential election 
Chris Hughes, a founding member and developer, left Facebook to work as an adviser for Barack Obama. While working at Facebook, Hughes had designed a Facebook profile for the then-presidential candidate. Following his departure, Hughes worked on Obama's Facebook page and used his knowledge of content management and new developments to outpace other candidates' online presence. Hughes created the website MyBarackObama.com, which had a similar concept and layout as Facebook. In the 2008 elections, Facebook continued to be used by electoral candidates. The main user during this election was Obama. Mitt Romney also used Facebook for his campaign, but not as much as Obama did. It is reported that well over 1,000 groups on Facebook were created supporting one of the two sides. In recent years, political figures have been using Twitter more often, but Facebook remains to be a frequently-used social media platform.

The 2008 presidential election was the first election where candidates used the Internet and social media as a campaign tool. Nearly three-quarters of Internet users went online to learn more about the candidates in the election; this equates to 55% of the entire adult population. Barack Obama was the first to use the Internet to organize supporters, advertise, and communicate with individuals in a way that had been impossible in previous elections. Obama engaged sites like YouTube to advertise through videos. The videos posted to YouTube by Obama were viewed for 14.5 million hours. Obama's supporters led McCain voters in all categories of online political activism, which was considered by some to be a major factor in his victory.

Young voters are comparatively more active in online politics. 30% of all those who posted political content online were under the age of twenty-five. 66% of that same demographic voted for Obama, while 33% voted for McCain, showing that Obama's online prominence increased his chances of winning.

In the aggregate, Democratic websites got more views than Republican websites (at least in the primaries). This was due, in part, to younger voters being more inclined to favor the Democratic candidate, as well as being more likely to use the Internet to research and show support for a candidate.

2012 presidential election
By the 2012 election, more candidates were using a wider array of social media platforms. Politicians were on social networking sites such as Twitter, Instagram, YouTube, and other new social media tools and mobile apps. Some candidates used social media sites to announce their candidacies. President Barack Obama emailed a video to 13 million users when he announced his intention to run for re-election, and Mitt Romney sent out a tweet. Obama produced a seventeen-minute-long video that was composed of video clips and interviews that documented Obama's first term in office. This video was published on YouTube and allowed the audience to contribute to the campaign without having to leave the website by including a donation link. This efficiency and convenience were key to further extending his fundraising base, which would not have been achieved without the existence of YouTube, as sharing the link would have been more challenging. Other candidates posted on Facebook, Twitter, as well as YouTube, to announce their candidacies.

The candidates ran their campaigns with greater emphasis on the use of social media. Obama and Romney each hired third-party companies to track and analyze data from their websites. This data drove them to each spend nearly $100,000 on online advertisements (Obama spent $93,400 and Romney spent $82,200). Although these numbers are close, in the aggregate, Obama spent more than Romney did on digital campaigns by a factor of ten: Obama spent $47 million and Romney spent $4.7 million.

Obama had a much larger digital presence than Romney throughout the campaign. In October 2012, Obama had over 20 million followers on Twitter, while Romney had 1.2 million. On Facebook Obama had over 29 million likes on his page, while Romney had 7.9 million. On Instagram Obama had 1.4 million followers, while Romney had 38,000. Obama had a higher following on all of his other social media accounts, including Spotify, Pinterest, and YouTube. Research suggests, however, that merely following Obama or Romney on social media sites like Facebook may have had little influence on voter behavior. Obama also engaged with his social media accounts more than any other candidate online. He actively posted more on Twitter, YouTube, and on a personal website blog.

In both 2008 and 2012, Obama's campaign thrived on online donations. In 2008, around 3.95 million people donated to his campaign. During his 2012 campaign, that number increased to 4.4 million people. The total online amount also rose from $500 million in 2008 to $690 million in 2012.

Other political figures used social media to accomplish tasks such as showing support for a presidential candidate. New Jersey governor Chris Christie tweeted his support for Obama in the 2012 election. At the time, he boasted an 80% approval rating, which led undecided voters to support Obama.

2016 presidential election

The 2016 presidential election saw heavy use of social media by all candidates. The top three candidates were Donald Trump, Hillary Clinton, and Bernie Sanders (the runners-up in the Democratic primary). The Pew Research Center reported that "in January 2016, 44% of U.S. adults reported having learned about the 2016 presidential election in the past week from social media." Roughly "24% say they have turned to the social media posts" for information regarding the election.

In the 2016 election, Twitter was the main platform for both Trump and Clinton, the two major-party nominees. The candidates used social media differently. While Trump's posts focused on links to news sources—such as Fox News or The New York Times, to get their attention—Clinton and Sanders focused on "highlighting official campaign communities" and promoting their own campaigns.

On Twitter, Trump also tended to retweet tweets from the general public, whereas Clinton and Sanders mainly retweeted tweets about their campaigns. Trump and Clinton tweeted about each other several times. Clinton used the "@" feature of Twitter, linking users to Trump's page. Trump referred to Clinton several times, but he rarely used the "@" feature.

Some of Clinton's and Sanders' posts were written in Spanish. The two Democratic candidates actively reached out to the Hispanic community, while Trump made no posts in Spanish.

Of the three candidates, Trump had a greater response from users compared to the two Democratic candidates, which is likely because Trump already had more followers at the beginning of the campaign.

2020 presidential election
During the 2020 presidential election, the use of social media by candidates, campaigns, and other stakeholders was considerable, playing an even larger role than in previous presidential races.  The two main candidates in this election were Donald Trump and Joe Biden. The Trump campaign spent $48.7 million and the Biden campaign spent $45.4 million on Facebook ads alone. Other candidates, such as Kanye West and Andrew Yang also generated large amounts of buzz on social media.

Facebook and Twitter, however, are facing intense criticism from lawmakers for their roles in politics, a criticism that is tied to antitrust concerns. A report from the House Judiciary subcommittee on antitrust stated, "In the absence of competition, Facebook’s quality has deteriorated over time, resulting in worse privacy protections for its users and a dramatic rise in misinformation on its platform." In response to these issues, Facebook has taken action and announced that it will not run any political ads in North America.

After the election was formally called for Biden by media agencies ranging from CNN to Fox News, Donald Trump proceeded to contest the 2020 election results' authenticity, using social media platforms, while also contesting it via multiple lawsuits. Although all the lawsuits were unsuccessful, Donald Trump's social media campaign and Stop The Steal initiative during this period is perceived by many to have culminated in the 2021 storming of the United States Capitol. This ultimately led to Trump's Twitter account being shut down by Twitter, which cited a breach of their usage policy.

Limitations and constraints
Social media has been used in political campaigns ranging from small local elections to large-scale presidential elections. According to Wael Ghonim, social media can reinforce pre-existing beliefs rather than promote new ones. While social media can be used to raise money, several candidates focused on using it to promote their campaigns. Politicians cannot control the conversation on social media. According to a study by Miguel del Fresno García, Alan J. Daly, and Sagrario Segado Sánchez-Cabezudo, regular friends and followers have more influence on social media than blogs and campaign pages. Users with the most influence fall into three different categories: users who disseminate knowledge, those who engage other people, and those who lead conversations. These three types of users are the ones whom others tend to follow and listen to. Therefore, for political campaigns to truly reach as many people as possible, political groups first need to get those three users talking about their campaigns on social media. With the many ways social media can be used in political campaigns, many U.S. social media users claim they are drained by the influx of political content in their feed.

Overuse of social media might lead to less lawmaking as more effort is put into gaining supporters. Due to the surplus of fake news stories, social media may undermine the credibility of campaigns. Andrea Calderaro wrote that social media allows online knowledge to spread easily ‘giving space to unqualified voices’. This could threaten the quality of political news by replacing the presumed authenticity and impartiality of professional journalists with possibly unreliable sources of information; during the 2016 election, "just below 55%" of online news was false. The political astroturfing approach defined by Jacob Ratkiewicz is a system that allows unqualified voices to gain influence through social media. Here, political campaign spams are disguised as grassroots behavior, when, in reality, the information is being spread by a single person or organization. The strategy seeks to build a "false sense of group consensus" about an idea so it will spread consistently by avid group supporters. This makes it easier for like-minded citizens to form filter bubbles which essentially isolate them from opposing contrary perspectives.

The political news circulated within one's bubble may be filled with one-sided fake news, allowing certain politicians to gain popularity through false pretenses. For example, throughout the 2016 election, 115 pro-Trump fake stories were shared 30 million times in comparison to the 41 pro-Clinton fake news stories that were shared only 7.6 million times. Some argue, such as Jill Lepore in the New Yorker, that this influence went as far as to tamper with election results. Circulation of Trump's fake news stories grew, such as one where wtoe5news.com reported that Pope Francis had endorsed Donald Trump's presidential candidacy. This may have allowed his right-wing populism to grow. As more fake news about Trump circulates online, filter bubbles will be more successful in shaping the worldview of voters.

Scandals
Political scandals have been a part of the American political system since its inception (see List of federal political scandals in the United States). Such scandals are events that capture a lot of attention, at first creating intense public commentary that eventually disappears from the mainstream media, which has been heavily involved in reporting past scandals. In recent decades, scandals relating to the Internet and social media have increased and which are less about illegal or corrupt activities than about what used to be private misdeeds. The first political scandal related to social media was the political demise of Congressman Anthony Weiner in 2011. Weiner, a Democrat from New York, sent a link, to a suggestive photograph, to a woman on his public Twitter account. The tweet and pictures were then sent to Andrew Breitbart, a conservative blogger, who posted them on his website before Weiner had a chance to take the tweet down. Within days the Anthony Weiner incident became national news. The scandal, nicknamed Weinergate, is considered to be the first sex scandal on social media involving a politician.

Political scandals affecting election outcomes have come about as a result of social media use. Joe Miller, a Senate candidate from Alaska, tweeted about decorating his office before winning his race. Miller deleted the tweets, but not before a blogger was able to capture screenshots of them. Miller eventually lost the election. Meg Whitman, a Republican candidate in California, was embarrassed by a tweet sent by her press secretary that included a YouTube video of a cross-dressed musician. Whitman lost her race to Jerry Brown. Pete Hoekstra, a Michigan Congressman, got into trouble after tweeting confidential details during a trip to Iraq, thereby breaching security. Politicians have become more vulnerable to scandals as their lives become more public on social media.

Among the political scandals of Trump's presidency was the alleged Russian interference in the election through social media. There is broad agreement that Russians working for the Internet Research Agency used a variety of social media platforms to attempt to influence election outcomes. The effects of social media scandals can be seen in the polarization of the country on this issue. 90% of Democrats were reported to have no confidence in Trump's ability to handle the investigation of Russia effectively, whereas only 23% of Republicans were reported to have no confidence in his ability to do so. On the other hand, 36% of Republicans indicated that the Mueller investigation was important, whereas 87% of Democrats indicated it was.

On October 26, 2018, Facebook announced it had deleted eighty-two accounts, created in Iran, that included posts advocating extreme positions on issues such as race, immigration, and U.S. President Donald Trump, just before U.S. congressional elections on November 6, 2020.

Social polarization is fragmenting a society previously envied by other parts of the world, as 92% of Republicans are to the right of the median Democrat, and 94% of Democrats are to the left of the median Republican.

See also
 Social media use by Barack Obama
 Social media use by Donald Trump
 Fake News in the United States
 Post-Truth Politics#Social Media and the Internet
 Social media use in politics
 Social media in the 2020 United States presidential election

References

Further reading
 Bennett, W. L. (2012). The personalization of politics political identity, social media, and changing patterns of participation. The Annals of the American Academy of Political and Social Science, 644(1), 20–39.
 Bimber, Bruce, et al. (2015) "Digital Media and Political Participation The Moderating Role of Political Interest Across Acts and Over Time." Social Science Computer Review 33#1 (2015): 21–42.
 DiGrazia, J., McKelvey, K., Bollen, J., & Rojas, F. (2013). More tweets, more votes: Social media as a quantitative indicator of political behavior. PLoS ONE, 8(11), e79449.
 Gil de Zúñiga, H., Molyneux, L., & Zheng, P. (2014). Social media, political expression, and political participation: Panel analysis of lagged and concurrent relationships. Journal of Communication, 64(4), 612–634.
 Graber, D.A., & Dunaway, J. (2014). Mass media and American politics. CQ Press.
 Halpern, D., & Gibbs, J. (2013). Social media as a catalyst for online deliberation? Exploring the affordances of Facebook and YouTube for political expression. Computers in Human Behavior, 29(3), 1159–1168.
 Hendricks, John Allen & Lynda Lee Kaid (Eds.), "Techno politics in presidential campaigning: New voices, new technologies, and new voters. (Routledge, 2010).
 Himelboim, I., Lariscy, R.W., Tinkham, S.F., & Sweetser, K.D. (2012). Social media and online political communication: The role of interpersonal informational trust and openness. Journal of Broadcasting & Electronic Media, 56(1), 92-115.
 Hinson, M.D. (2012). Examining how social and emerging media have been used in public relations between 2006 and 2012: A longitudinal analysis. Public Relations Review.
Johnson, Janet (2021). Political Rhetoric, Social Media, and American Presidential Campaigns: Candidates' Use of New Media. Lexington Books. 
Klinger, U., & Svensson, J. (2014). The emergence of network media logic in political communication: A theoretical approach. new media & society, 1461444814522952.
 McChesney, Robert W.  (2015)  Rich media, poor democracy: Communication politics in dubious times (New Press, 2015), A critique from the left
 Pennington, N., Winfrey, K.L., Warner, B.R., and Kearney, M.W. (2015). Liking Obama and Romney (on Facebook): An experimental evaluation of political engagement and efficacy during the 2012 general election. Computers in Human Behavior, 44, 279-283. doi:10.1016/j.chb.2014.11.032
 Rubenzer, Trevor. "Social Media Foreign Policy: Examining the Political Use of Social Media by Ethnic Identity Groups in the United States." Politics (2015).
 Shirky, Clay. (2011) "The political power of social media." Foreign affairs 90#1 (2011): 28–41.
 Sobkowicz, P., Kaschesky, M., & Bouchard, G. (2012). Opinion mining in social media: Modeling, simulating, and forecasting political opinions in the web. Government Information Quarterly, 29(4), 470–479.	
 Stieglitz, S., & Dang-Xuan, L. (2012, January). Political communication and influence through microblogging—An empirical analysis of sentiment in Twitter messages and retweet behavior. In System Science (HICSS), 2012 45th Hawaii International Conference on (pp. 3500-3509). IEEE.
 Stieglitz, S., & Dang-Xuan, L. (2013). Social media and political communication: a social media analytics framework. Social Network Analysis and Mining, 3(4), 1277–1291.
 Stromer-Galley, J. (2019). Presidential campaigning in the internet age. Oxford University Press.
Vromen, A., Xenos, M. A., & Loader, B. (2015). Young people, social media and connective action: from organizational maintenance to everyday political talk. Journal of Youth Studies, 18(1), 80-100.
 West, D. M. (2013). Air Wars: Television Advertising and Social Media in Election Campaigns, 1952–2012. Sage.
 Wolfsfeld, G., Segev, E., & Sheafer, T. (2013). Social media and the Arab Spring politics come first. The International Journal of Press/Politics, 18(2), 115–137.
 Xenos, Michael, Ariadne Vromen, and Brian D. Loader.  (2015)  "The great equalizer? Patterns of social media use and youth political engagement in three advanced democracies." Information, Communication & Society'' 17#.2 (2014): 151–167. Covers United States, United Kingdom, and Australia
 Yamamoto, M., Kushin, M. J., & Dalisay, F. (2013). Social media and mobiles as political mobilization forces for young adults: Examining the moderating role of online political expression in political participation. New Media & Society, 1461444813518390.

Politics of the United States
Political communication

E-government in the United States